Theropithecus is a genus of primates in the family Cercopithecidae. It contains a single living species, the gelada (Theropithecus gelada), native to the Ethiopian Highlands. 

Additional species are known from fossils, including:
Theropithecus brumpti
Theropithecus darti
Theropithecus oswaldi

References

Papionini
Primate genera
Mammal genera with one living species
Taxa named by Isidore Geoffroy Saint-Hilaire
Taxa described in 1843